City is a German rock band, formed in East Berlin in 1972, best known for the song "Am Fenster" ("At/By The Window") from its 1978 debut album.

The band was founded as the City Band Berlin by Fritz Puppel (guitar), Klaus Selmke (drums), Ingo Doering (bass guitar), Klaus Witte (keyboards), Frank Pfeiffer (vocals) and Andreas Pieper (flute). The lineup changed frequently in the band's early years, but stabilized by 1976, with Puppel and Selmke joined by Bulgarian violinist and bassist Georgi Gogow and vocalist-guitarist Toni Krahl. They changed their name to City Rock Band and eventually to simply City.

City toured extensively in East Germany, and was given the opportunity to record an album in 1978. The eponymous City showcased the band's guitar-driven rock; several songs are parables, such as "Der King vom Prenzlauer Berg" (The King Of Prenzlauer Berg), about a young man who gets into too many fights; and "Meister aller Klassen" (Masters Of All Classes"), about cocky motorcyclists whose desire for speed ends in tragedy.

The band's greatest commercial success, however, was the atypical folk rock-influenced "Am Fenster" (At the Window), which arose from a jam session in the studio when Gogow began to play on his violin. It eventually coalesced into a three-part, 17-minute piece (as well as a four-minute version for radio play). An immediate hit in East Germany, it also became successful in West Germany and was a success in countries such as Greece. Following the song's success, City sold half a million copies. In 2019, Am Fenster was voted by a jury as the best song of all time from East Germany.

Discography
 1978 Am Fenster (At The Window; released in West Germany as City)
 1979 Der Tätowierte (The Tattooed Man; released in West Germany as City II)
 1980 Dreamer (English language album, released in West Germany as Dreamland)
 1983 Unter der Haut (Under The Skin)
 1985 Feuer im Eis (Fire in Ice)
 1987 Casablanca
 1990 Keine Angst (No Fear)
 1991 Rock aus Deutschland Ost Vol. 11 – City, die Erfolge 1977–1987 (Compilation album)
 1992 The Best of City (Compilation album)
 1997 Rauchzeichen (Smoke Signals)
 1997 Am Fenster (Platinum Edition)
 2002 Am Fenster 2
 2003 Das Weihnachtsfest der Rockmusik (Album with Keimzeit) (Christmas Festival Of Rock Music)
 2004 Silberstreif am Horizont (Silver Line On The Horizon)
 2007 Yeah! Yeah! Yeah!
 2007: Yeah! Yeah! Yeah! (Limited Edition, 5-Song-Live-CD)
 2008: Das Beste (4-CD Compilation)
 2008: Play it again! Das Beste von City (Best-Of-Album including new tracks, remixes and a videoclip)
 2012: Für immer jung (Forever Young)
 2012: City - Die Original Alben, Hansa Amiga (Sony Music) (Compilation of the original City albums)
 2012: 40 Jahre City (Das Konzert), (Sony Music)
 2013: Danke Engel (CD/DVD Unplugged + 5 neue Tracks)
 2015: Rocklegenden live, Puhdys + City + Karat
 2017: Das Blut so laut, Rhingtön (Universal Music)

References

External links

  
 
 

East German musical groups
Musical groups established in 1972
Musical groups from Berlin